The 2013 United States Men's Curling Championship was held from February 9 to 16 at the Cornerstone Community Center in Green Bay, Wisconsin. It was held in conjunction with the 2013 United States Women's Curling Championship. The winning team will represent the United States at the 2013 World Men's Curling Championship in Victoria, British Columbia, Canada. The championship also acted as a qualifier to the 2014 United States Olympic Curling Trials, awarding qualifying spots to the winners and runners-up of the championship.

Road to the Nationals

A total of ten teams qualified to participate in the men's national championship through the High Performance Program, through the World Curling Tour Order of Merit, or through a challenge round.

Teams
Ten teams participated in the national championship. The teams are listed as follows:

Round-robin standings
Final round-robin standings

Round-robin results
All draw times are listed in Central Standard Time (UTC−6).

Draw 1
Saturday, February 9, 8:30 pm

Draw 2
Sunday, February 9, 12:00 pm

Draw 3
Sunday, February 9, 8:00 pm

Draw 4
Monday, February 10, 12:00 pm

Draw 5
Monday, February 10, 8:00 pm

Draw 6
Tuesday, February 11, 2:00 pm

Draw 7
Wednesday, February 12, 8:00 am

Draw 8
Wednesday, February 12, 4:00 pm

Draw 9
Thursday, February 13, 8:00 am

Tiebreakers

Thursday, February 14, 2:00 pm

Thursday, February 14, 8:00 pm

Playoffs

1 vs. 2
Friday, February 14, 9:00 am

3 vs. 4
Friday, February 14, 9:00 am

Semifinal
Friday, February 14, 8:00 pm

Final
Saturday, February 15, 3:00 pm

References

External links

USA Curling Home

United States Men's Curling Championship
Curling Championship
United States Men's Curling Championship
United States National Curling Championships
Curling in Wisconsin